Vital Cliche (September 10, 1890 – February 23, 1976) was a politician Quebec, Canada and a Member of the Legislative Assembly of Quebec (MLA).

Early life

He was born on September 10, 1890 in Saint-Joseph-de-Beauce, Quebec and became an insurance broker. He was the father of politician Lucien Cliche.

Local politics

Cliche served as a school board member in 1919 and as Mayor of Vallée-Jonction, Quebec from 1931 to 1932.

Member of the legislature

He ran as an Action libérale nationale candidate in the district of Beauce in the 1935 provincial election and won. Cliche refused to join Maurice Duplessis's Union Nationale. Instead, he ran as an Independent Liberal in the 1936 election and lost to Raoul Poulin. He also ran as an Action libérale nationale candidate and lost a by-election that was called in 1937 as a result of Poulin's switch to federal politics.

Death

He died on February 23, 1976.

References

1890 births
1976 deaths
People from Beauce, Quebec
Action libérale nationale MNAs
Mayors of places in Quebec